The Dairy and Tobacco Adjustment Act of 1983 (P.L. 98-180) is a United States federal law.

Dairy Production Stabilization Act
Title I, known as the Dairy Production Stabilization Act of 1983, authorized a voluntary Dairy Diversion Program, which was operated between January 1984 and March 1985.  Producers who elected to participate in the program and reduce their milk marketings by between 5% and 30% below their base production were paid $10 per hundred pounds (cwt.) for these reductions.  For a 16-month period (12/1/83- 3/31/85), all dairy farmers were assessed 50¢/cwt. on all milk marketed to help defray the cost of the diversion program.

Also, Title I authorized a national dairy promotion program (or, check-off program) for generic dairy product promotion, research and nutrition education.  This self-help program is funded through a permanent 15¢/cwt. assessment on all milk production, and is administered by a board of dairy farmers who are appointed by the Secretary of Agriculture.

Tobacco Adjustment Act
Title II was designated the Tobacco Adjustment Act of 1983.  Title II provided for reduced levels of price support for tobacco, the prohibition of lease and transfer of flue-cured quota, the mandatory sale of allotments and quotas by nonfarming entities, the required inspection of imported tobacco, and various other modifications to the tobacco programs.

References 
 

United States federal agriculture legislation